Local authorities in Kenya are the bodies controlling local governance in urban areas in Kenya.

From the 2013 general elections onwards Kenya will have three classes of local authorities: City'forms, Municipality, and Town'' authorities. Subject to the Urban Areas and Cities Act of 2011, there  are four authorities with city status: Nairobi, the national capital, Mombasa, Kisumu and Nakuru. Municipalities and towns are other forms of urban authorities and are generally named after their central town.

Local authorities usually differ from divisional and constituency boundaries used by the state administration.

Under the former act of parliament local authority administration consisted of a mayor, town clerk and councillors. The number of councillors depended on population and area of each authority and they were elected by the public during the Kenya general elections held every five years or by-elections held in between. Authorities were divided into wards and each ward elects only one councillor. Wards have often common boundaries with administrative locations.

Compared to many other countries, local authorities in Kenya were weak and are shadowed by state run administration. However, during the international Africities summit held in Nairobi September 2006, the Kenyan president Mwai Kibaki promised to strengthen local authorities.

Under Kenya's new devolved system of government, the elected councils were dissolved and are set to be replaced by boards, in the case of city councils, and administrators, in the case of municipal and town councils, appointed by the county governments.

List of local authorities in Kenya
These are the local authorities, dissolved in 2013, that operated under the old local authorities act.

Nairobi County
 Nairobi city

Kiambu County
 Kiambu municipality
 Kiambu county council
 Limuru municipality
 Kikuyu town council
 Karuri town council
 Thika District
 Thika municipality
 Thika county council
 Ruiru municipality

Kirinyaga County
 Kerugoya/Kutus municipality
 Kirinyaga county council
 Sagana town council

Nyandarua County
 Ol Kalou town council
 Nyandarua county council

Nyeri County
 Nyeri municipality
 Nyeri county council
 Karatina municipality
 Othaya town council

Murang'a County
 Murang'a District
 Murang'a municipality
 Murang'a county council
 Kangema town council
 Maragua District
 Maragua town council
 Maragua county council
 Kandara town council
 Makuyu town council

Kilifi County
 Kilifi town council
 Kilifi county council
 Mariakani town council

Kwale County
 Kwale town council
 Kwale county council
 Malindi District
 Malindi municipality
 Malindi county council

Lamu County
 Lamu county council

Mombasa County
 Mombasa municipality

Taita-Taveta County
 Taita-Taveta county council
 Taveta town council
 Voi municipality

Tana River County
 Tana river- Hola
 Tana delta- Garseni
 Tana north - Bura

Embu County
 Embu municipality
 Embu county council
 Runyenjes municipality
 Mbeere District
 Mbeere county council

Isiolo County
 Isiolo county council

Kitui County
 Kitui municipality
 Kitui county council
 Mwingi District
 Mwingi town council
 Mwingi county council

Makueni County
 Wote town council
 Makueni county council
 Mtito Andei town council

Machakos County
 Machakos municipality
 Masaku county council
 Mavoko municipality (Athi River town)
 Kangundo town council
 Matuu town council

Marsabit County
 Marsabit county council
 Moyale county council

Meru County
 Meru Central District
 Meru municipality
 Meru county council
 Meru North District (Nyambene District)
 Maua 0796845615municipality
 Myambene county council

Tharaka-Nithi County
 Meru South District
 Chuka municipality
 Chogoria town council
 Meru south county council
 Tharaka District
 Tharaka county council

Garissa County
 Garissa municipality
 Garissa county council
 Ijara District
 Ijara county council

Mandera County
 Mandera town council
 Mandera county council

Wajir County
 Wajir county council
 Gucha District
 Ogembo town council
 Gucha county council
 Nyamarambe town council
 Nyamache town council
 Tabaka town council

Homa Bay County
 Homa Bay municipality
 Homa Bay county council

Kisii County
 Kisii Central District
 Kisii municipality
 Gusii county council
 Keroka town council
 Suneka town council
 Masimba town council

Nyamira County
 Nyamira town council
 Nyamira county council
 Nyansiongo town council

Kisumu County
 Kisumu municipality
 Kisumu county council

Migori County
 Kuria District
 Kehancha municipality
 Migori District
 Migori municipality
 Migori county council
 Rongo town council
 Awendo town council
 Rachuonyo District
 Oyugis town council
 Kendu Bay town council
 Rachuonyo county council

Siaya County
 Siaya municipality
 Siaya county council
 Yala town council
 Ugunja town council
 Ukwala town council
 Suba District
 Mbita Point town council
 Suba county council
 Bondo District
 Bondo town council
 Bondo county council

Baringo County 
 Baringo District
 Kabarnet municipality
 Baringo county council

Bomet County
 Bomet municipality
 Bomet county council
 Buret District
 Litein town council
 Buret county council
 Sotik town council

Elgeyo Marakwet County
 Keiyo District
 Iten/Tambach town council
 Keiyo county council
 Marakwet District
 Marakwet county council

Kajiado County
 Kajiado town council
 Olkejuado county council

Kericho County
 Kericho municipality
 Kipsigis county council
 Londiani town council
 Kipkelion town council
 Koibatek District
 Eldama Ravine town council
 Koibatek county council

Laikipia County
 Nanyuki municipality
 Laikipia county council
 Nyahururu municipality
 Rumuruti town council

Nakuru County
 Nakuru city
 Nakuru County Council
 Naivasha municipality
 Molo municipality
 Gilgil municipality

Nandi County
 Kapsabet municipality
 Nandi county council
 Nandi Hills town council

Narok County
 Narok town council
 Narok county council
 Trans Mara District
 Trans Mara county council (Kilgoris)

Samburu County
 Maralal town council
 Samburu county council

Trans-Nzoia County
 Kitale municipality
 Nzoia county council

Turkana County
 Lodwar municipality
 Turkana county council
 Nanam Ward in Turkana West serves as the main source of minerals, contact Lokarach Titus for more details. 0720703380

Uasin Gishu County
 Eldoret municipality
 Wareng county council
 Burnt Forest town council

West Pokot County
 Kapenguria municipality
 Pokot county council
 Chepareria town council

Bungoma County
 Bungoma municipality
 Bungoma county council
 Kimilili municipality
 Sirisia town council
 Malakisi town council
 Webuye municipality
 Mount Elgon District
 Mount Elgon county council

Busia County
 Busia municipality
 Busia county council
 Funyula town council
 Nambale town council
 Port Victoria town council
 Teso District
 Malaba town council
 Teso county council

Kakamega County
 Kakamega municipality
 Kakamega county council
 Malava town council
 Butere/Mumias District
 Butere-Mumias county council
 Mumias municipality
 Lugari District
 Lugari county council

Vihiga County
 Vihiga municipality
 Vihiga county council
 Luanda town council

See also 
 Subdivisions of Kenya

References

External links
 https://web.archive.org/web/20110103012703/http://www.localgovernment.go.ke/
 https://web.archive.org/web/20071103080803/http://www.algak.net/
 http://treasury.go.ke/cbs.go.ke/pdf/authority.pdf

Subdivisions of Kenya
 
Government agencies of Kenya